Jacques Terpant, born 11 April 1957 in Romans-sur-Isère, Drôme, is a French comics artist. He debuted in 1982 with the comic book Branle-bas de combat, made together with Luc Cornillon. His style is inspired by Jean Giraud.

In 2011 he received the Prix Saint-Michel for best artwork, for the third volume of his Sept cavaliers series, which is based on Jean Raspail's novel with the same title.

Bibliography
 Branle-bas de combat (1982) with Luc Cornillon (Humanoïdes Associés).
 New-York inferno (1983), scenario Doug Headline (Magic Strip).
 La citadelle pourpre (1988), scenario Doug Headline (Éditions Delcourt).
 Le Céleste (1988), scenario Tourette (Éditions Delcourt).
 Le Passage de la saison morte (2 volumes, 1989–1990)
 La Blessure du Khan (1990), scenario Cailleteau, éditions Zenda.
 Messara (3 volumes, 1994–1996)
 Méditerranéennes (1996), éditions Jotim
 Pirates (5 volumes, 2001–2007)
 Le Château des femmes (2002), text by Françoise Rey (Éditions IPM).
 Contes et Légendes des Monts du Matin (2008), text by Patrick Bellier, éditions Glénat.
 Sept Cavaliers (3 volumes, 2008–2010), based on Sept cavaliers by Jean Raspail
 Le Royaume de Borée (3 volumes, 2011–2014), based on Les Royaumes de Borée by Jean Raspail
 Capitaine perdu (2 volumes, 2015–2016), éditions Glénat, based on the life of Louis Groston de Saint-Ange de Bellerive.
 L'Imagier de Jacques Terpant (2015), éditions Sandawe.

References

External links
 Official website 

1957 births
French comics artists
French comics writers
Living people
People from Romans-sur-Isère